Romanian dress refers to the traditional clothing worn by Romanians, who live primarily in Romania and Moldova, with smaller communities in Ukraine and Serbia. Today, the vast majority of Romanians wear modern style dress on most occasions, and the garments described here largely fell out of use during the 20th century. However, they can still be seen in more remote areas, on special occasions, and at ethnographic and folk events. Each historical region has its own specific variety of costume.

Ethnographic regions
Romanian traditional clothing can be classified according to seven traditional regions. These can be further subdivided by ethnographic zones, which may range between 40 and 120, depending on the criteria used.

The seven main regions are:
 Transylvania or Ardeal
 The western plains: Lower Mureș Plain, Criș Plain (Crișul Negru, Crișul Alb, Crișul Repede), Lower Someș Plain (Oaș Country)
 Banat, including Timiș Meadow and Caraș-Severin
 Wallachia, including Oltenia and Muntenia
 The Lower Danube, including Bărăgan, Dobruja and southern Moldavia
 Moldavia, including Bessarabia, Bukovina and Transnistria
 Balkans or Romanians of the Balkan Peninsula, which can be further subdivided into four areas:
 The Daco-Romanians along the borders: Cadrilater (Bulgaria), the Timok Valley (northwestern Bulgaria and eastern Serbia), Vojvodina/Serbian Banat and Ukraine (especially around Chernivtsi and Odessa)
 Istro-Romanians in Istria, Croatia
 Macedo-Romanians (or Aromanians) in Albania, Bulgaria, Greece and North Macedonia
 Megleno-Romanians in Greece and North Macedonia

Genesis and evolution of Romanian traditional costume

First mentions about Romanian clothing

The Romanian popular costume finds its roots in the part of Thracian, Dacian and Getae ancestors and resembles with that of the peoples of the Balkan Peninsula, of course with differences consisting of decorative and colorful details. For example, women portraits carved on Trajan's Column in Rome after the Dacian wars provide information about their clothing. Dacian women wore shirts rippled at the neck. Sleeves were either long and wide or short. The dress was long to the ground, over which sometimes was attached a wide draped mantle. In the feet they wore leather sandals in summer and fur sandals in winter.

Middle Ages and Byzantine influence

Portraits of the founders provide important information about the type of material of which were made the pieces of the port and about elements of tailoring, decor and chromatics. Between the eighteenth and nineteenth centuries, votive paintings on the walls of churches reserved to country's rulers and nobility hypostasiate a wider range of donors. As a result, in the sub-Carpathian areas of Oltenia (especially in Gorj) appear portraits of free peasants, freeholders and yeomen.

But representations of peasant port date from the fourteenth century. In Codex Latinus Parisinus, written during 1395–1396 by Paulus Sanctinus Ducensis, military engineer of King Sigismund of Luxembourg, besides portraits of knights and footmen appear described ancillaries of the army: craftsmen, cartmen, fishermen. In Chronicon Pictum Vindobonense are portrayed men in white shirts and trousers. Over they wore shaggy  with long sleeves and left on back. They wore simple leather shoes. In a simple comparative analysis it can be grasped that these elements are always present in the port of remote shepherds. Diaries of foreign travelers, particularly those of Antonio Maria Del Chiaro Fiorentino (secretary of Italian language of Constantin Brâncoveanu) and officer Friedrich Schwanz von Springfels contain rich information about the garments of Romanians: ladies, patronesses and peasant women wore identically tailored shirts, distinct being only the methods used for decoration.

Boyar shirts were of silk, embroidered with gold thread and decorated with pearls. The costume of Oltenia peasant women was composed of cotton shirts sewn with altițe, striped catrințe and bete. Like them, patronesses wore on head long headkerchief of floss silk or flax, that hung on back.

In the context of building the national conscience, beginning with the mid-19th century there was a process of standardization and idealisation of the Romanian port, in order to distinguish it from surrounding ethnic groups.

The present situation
After World War I, the popular clothing generalized across traditional communities remain just in the everyday life of older generation, becoming a ceremonial vestment. In rural penetrated some albums with "national motifs" edited by traders of textile fibers and dyes industries. During the communist period, these mutations decreased the creative process of costumes in the households.

Nowadays, the main wearers of peasant garb are the soloists of folk music, the folk dance ensembles and the actors in movies and shows.

Men's clothing

Ițari
The ițari are typical for Moldovans and represent a pair of long peasant trousers that were sewn from țigaie (a special breed of sheep wool) and had a length of 2 m, but being narrow, they were crimped on the leg from ankle to the knee. They were worn during the summer and the winter. Ițarii for summer wear are made of pânză de sac (bulky cotton).

Cioareci
The cioareci are peasant pants of white woollen cloth (dimie, pănură or aba) woven in four threads, therefore thicker than the ițari. In Banat, the cioareci are known as canvas or baize stockings worn by women during the winter. In Moldavia can be found cioareci without creți that are worn in the working days. Here, they are also known as bernevici.

In the South and Moldavia, trousers are worn over boots or shoes whereas in Transylvania they are tucked into the tops of the boots.

The amount and style of decoration on cioareci depends on regional style. The majority of the decoration is on the upper parts of the trousers around the pockets, and front. Trousers worn with boots did not have any decoration on the lower part whereas those worn with spats had decoration down the legs accenting the cut of the trousers and round the hems or turn-ups.

The oldest type of footwear is peasant sandals worn with hemp canvas, woollen or felt foot wraps or woollen socks (călțuni). Evidence for this style of footwear can be seen on a clay foot found in Turdaș, dating from around 2500 BC.  were worn throughout Romania and over a wide area of south and east Europe being known as opanke (Serbia), tservuli (Bulgaria),  (North Macedonia), etc.  are made of a single rectangle of cow, ox or pig hide gathered round the foot in various ways.

Pieptar
Known often by various names locally, the pieptar is an embroidered sheepskin vest, made generally in two styles, opened (spintecat) or close (înfundat), with the first being of normal front cut and the second one having a side open to be closed with buttons or taken over the head like a pullover. They were usually made from sheepskin, with the sheared or non sheared fur worn inside for warmth and the embroidered part outwards.

Cămașă
Cămașă is literally the Romanian word for shirt, and the variety of cuts and styles is overwhelming, varying greatly not only by area but also by age, status and occupation, only to be surpassed in variety by the women ones. Traditionally they were made of hemp or linseed linen, later of cotton.

Suman
The suman is a long peasant coat, a cold weather garment, worn by both sexes, usually knee-deep, in white, cream, brown, gray or black woolen cloth (felt), decorated with various găitane. It is also known as țundră, zeghe or dulamă. They were normally tailored rough at home by the poor or by special suman makers from strips of shrunk woven boiled wool cloth, processed in water powered fulling-mills known as "vâltoare". Sumans vary in thickness greatly from region to region, from a few millimeters finely woven material in the south (Oltenia and Dobrudja), to a very rough two centimeters in north (Maramures).

Chimir and brâu 
Of great importance was the girdle, their thick belt made of leather in case of chimir or woven textile in case of brau.

Hats

Sheepskin hats

Căciulă are worn all over Romania and in most of the surrounding Balkan countries in winter. Fur hats are made by furriers and are most often black, although white căciulă are worn in parts of Banat and grey in central and north Moldavia. There are four types of căciulă found in Romania:
 High conical cap – căciulă țuguiată, moțată, cujmă – this is made of four pieces joined together lengthwise. It can be worn peaked, with top bent forward, back or sideways, or with top sunk inwards, depending on local fashion. It is worn in Moldavia, Muntenia, Maramures, Oltenia and Banat, originally by the "free men". In Banat Mountains, the cap is sometimes worn with fur inside and a narrow white fur hem at base.
 Round low cap known as cujmă rotilată in Maramureș, consisting of two parts: a long band forming a cylinder and a round top sewn to the upper edge of the cylinder.
 Caps made of a single piece of fur are also found in Maramureș and Oaș. These are made by stretching the raw fur on a spherical wooden shaped block which makes it take the shape of the head. This simple "skull" cap was formally worn by serfs.
 Căciulă joasă – cylindrical fur cap with the top larger than the base. This is called mocănească, rotată, retezată or turtită and is worn by shepherds on both sides of the southern Carpathians (in Mărginimea Sibiului, Oltenia, Muntenia and Vrancea) and also in Bărăgan Plain and Dobruja due to this area being used for summer pastures by the Carpathian shepherds, and also in Maramureș.

Felt hats
Hard felt hats are made by specialised craftsmen in workshops and are worn throughout the year. These hats are found centred on the Saxon regions around Sibiu and Bistrița and may have been introduced into Transylvania by the Saxons, whose craftsmen made them in workshops, from the 18th century. The style varies widely in shape and size of brim according to area. The wide brimmed hat appeared around the 17th-19th centuries and felt hats with broad brims up to 60 cm were worn in the 19th and early 20th centuries, and continued to be worn in Bistrița Valley, Moldavia until the 1940s. Hats with 40 cm brims were worn in central Transylvania and Muntenia. Felt hats with hard upturned brims – cu găng – were worn in Crișana, Hunedoara and Bukovina following a fashion of the gentry. Wide brimmed felt hats with a large peacock feather (roată de păun) are still worn in Năsăud, further south the hats are much reduced in size, shepherds in Sibiu and along the southern Carpathians wear felt hats with very small brims, the present day fashion tending to do away with the brim altogether.

Green "trilby"-style hats worn by Romanian border guards and mountain corps are still found in Pădureni and other areas today. This style originated in the Austrian Tyrol, and reached Romania during Habsburg rule, and became international due to the Habsburg's preference for wearing Tyrolese costume for hunting throughout their Empire. This style is now widespread for everyday use.

Straw hats

Straw hats are worn by men (and women) throughout Romania in the summer. Straw hats vary in style from region to region although regional differences are now becoming less common as the straw version of the trilby takes over.

In Maramureș, traditional straw hats (clop, pl. clopuri) are very small, while in Satu Mare, Arad, Transylvanian Plain hats have a high crown. The tallest – around  – can be found in Codru. In Oltenia and Teleroman, along the Danube, flat brimmed straw hats with rounded crown are worn. In Maramureș and Oaș Country, men also often wear their clopuri in the winter.

Women's clothing

Ie
Ie is the type of shirt of a typical gathered form of the collar, which has existed since ancient times. It is also known as the "Carpathian shirt", similar to the Slavic (Bulgarian, Serbian, Ukrainian, etc.) peoples. The three-part decor code of this pleated shirt is almost always the same: in addition to the upper arm embroidery, the altiță (derived from Serbian ла̏тица), there is a single horizontal row on the sleeve, known as increț, and diagonal stripes below the armpit and shoulder, the râuri. The upper arm embroidery characterizes the entire costume; it is traditionally seen as the culmination of embroidery and decoration. Each blouse tells a compelling story about the region it comes from through the symbols and colors used.

Fotă
The fotă is a richly ornamented wrap-around skirt made out of a rectangular piece of woolen fabric worn at the waist. Alternately, it can be made of two pieces of woven material that cover the front of the body (like an apron) and the back. The fotă has several names, according to the ethnographic region: pestelcă (in Muntenia), opreg, vălnic and zăvelcă (in Oltenia), catrință or cretință (in Moldavia), păstură and zadie (in Transylvania), peștiman (in Bessarabia).

The fotă is made of woollen material or cotton mixed with wool, woven on four heddles. It fully covers the underskirt (poale) except for, in some areas, the hem. The oldest fote were made of black or greyish brown fabric using the natural colours of the wool. The earliest decoration was a red border (bete roșii) at the lower edge and on the front edge, which strengthen the fabric. This type of fotă is still found in north Moldavia where fote made of hemp or flax were formerly worn in some parts in summer. Fote with vertical stripes (vâstre) are also common in this area. The extent of the decoration becomes more elaborate as one moves south. The stripes change from simple woven decoration to alternately simple stripes and stripes of woven motifs (alesăture). In Muntenia, the stripes are replaced by compact woven decoration or heavy geometric embroidery, covering the whole surface except for the area which is overlapped in the front. The richest decoration is found in Argeș and Muscel zones where the fotă itself is occasionally made from silk, and the woven decoration is in gold or silver thread.

Maramă
Among the elements that should not miss in women's clothing are the "head coverings". They have a great aesthetic and social value for women. Young girls accustom to walk bareheaded, but after the wedding ritual – "bride's binders", "bride undressing" – the godmother puts her a beautiful basma or maramă.

The maramă is worn mainly in southern Romania, southern Moldavia and southern Transylvania. Marame possibly have an oriental origin and are decorated with white patterns woven onto a white background and often grouped toward the ends. In Argeș, the patterns can include coloured geometric motifs.

See also
 Căluşari
 La Blouse Roumaine
 Paparuda

Notes
 Dicţionarul explicativ al limbii române (DEX), Academia Română, Institutul de Lingvistică "Iorgu Iordan", Editura Univers Enciclopedic, 1998

External links

 Traditional costume in Romania
 Folk Costumes of Romania
 Old Traditional Romanian Folk Costumes

Romanian clothing
Romanian culture
Moldovan culture
Folk costumes